Steven Christopher Bono (born May 11, 1962) is a former American football quarterback in the National Football League (NFL). He played in college at University of California at Los Angeles (UCLA). He was drafted by the Minnesota Vikings in the 6th round (142nd overall) of the 1985 NFL Draft. He played for seven different teams in 15 different seasons, spending the most amount of time with the San Francisco 49ers and Kansas City Chiefs.

Collegiate career
Bono attended the University of California at Los Angeles, where he received a degree in sociology.  As a Bruins quarterback, Bono posted collegiate career numbers of 177 completions in 315 attempts. On January 1, 1985, Bono threw for 243 yards and 2 touchdowns on his way to Quarterbacking the Bruins to Victory in the 1985 Fiesta Bowl over Bernie Kosar and the Miami Hurricanes. Bono also earned a varsity letter in baseball as the team's catcher.

Professional career

Minnesota Vikings
Bono was selected by the Minnesota Vikings with the 142nd overall pick in the sixth round in the 1985 NFL Draft.

In his first two seasons with the Vikings (1985 and 1986), Bono appeared in two games.  He spent both seasons third on the depth chart behind starter Tommy Kramer and his backup Wade Wilson.  At the end of the 1986 season, the Vikings placed Bono on waivers.

Pittsburgh Steelers and Atlanta Falcons
Bono then signed as a free agent with the Pittsburgh Steelers.  Bono appeared in five games over two seasons with the Steelers (1987-1988). He made his first NFL start on October 4, 1987, against the Atlanta Falcons. After the 1988 season, the Steelers allowed Bono to become a free agent.

San Francisco 49ers
On June 13, 1989, Bono signed a contract with the San Francisco 49ers where he remained for five seasons, his longest stay with one team in his career.  The 49ers would win Super Bowl XXIV in his first season with the team, marking the only Super Bowl win of his career. However, he did not play in the game. Bono spent the 1989 and 1990 seasons as the 49ers' third-string quarterback behind Joe Montana and Steve Young.  In 1991, with Montana lost for the season, and Steve Young injured mid-season, Bono started six games.  He went 5-1 as a starter and finished the season fourth in passer rating.  Bono returned to his backup role behind Young in 1992 and 1993.

Kansas City Chiefs
Prior to the 1994 season, the 49ers traded Bono to the Kansas City Chiefs, where once again he served as a backup to his former 49ers teammate Joe Montana. After Montana retired, Bono became the starting quarterback in 1995. On October 1, 1995, in a game against the Arizona Cardinals, Bono ran 76 yards for a touchdown, the longest scoring run by a quarterback in NFL history up to that time. In the same season, he guided the Chiefs to a 13–3 record and a division title.  At season's end, he was selected for the AFC Pro Bowl team.  Bono remained the Chiefs starter throughout the 1996 season.

Journeyman years
Bono finished his career with several short stints. He signed as a free agent with the Green Bay Packers in 1997.  Bono spent 1998 with the St. Louis Rams. The following year, he signed with the Carolina Panthers.

Personal life

Bono and his wife have two children, and live in Palo Alto, California.  His son, Christoph, was the quarterback for the Palo Alto High School's football team and then played baseball for the UCLA Bruins. Christoph played with future Green Bay Packers wide receiver Davante Adams in high school.  Christoph also played professionally in the San Francisco Giants and San Diego Padres minor league systems and with the independent Gary SouthShore RailCats.

An avid golfer, Bono held an annual golf event in the San Francisco area benefiting the National Kidney Foundation.  Bono also played in the 1993 Pebble Beach National Pro-Am golf tournament, one of the most prestigious pro-am events in the United States.

Bono now works for Constellation Wealth Advisors, an independent firm in Menlo Park, California.

References

External links

 Pro-football-reference.com Profile

1962 births
Living people
American football quarterbacks
UCLA Bruins baseball players
UCLA Bruins football players
Minnesota Vikings players
Pittsburgh Steelers players
San Francisco 49ers players
Kansas City Chiefs players
Green Bay Packers players
St. Louis Rams players
Carolina Panthers players
American Conference Pro Bowl players
People from Norristown, Pennsylvania
Players of American football from Pennsylvania
Sportspeople from Montgomery County, Pennsylvania
National Football League replacement players